Penelope is the fourth largest impact crater on Tethys, which is one of Saturn's moons. It is 208 kilometers wide, and is located near the equator in the center of trailing hemisphere of the moon at 10.8°S, 249.2°W. It is approximately opposite to the largest crater on Tethys—Odysseus.

Penelope crater is named after the faithful wife of Odysseus by Homer.

References

External links
 Cassini images of Melanthius Crater

Impact craters on Saturn's moons
Surface features of Tethys (moon)